Khulasat-ut-Tawarikh ("Epitome of History") is a Persian language chronicle written by Sujan Rai in the Mughal Empire of present-day India. It deals with the history of Hindustan (northern Indian subcontinent), and also contains details about the contemporary Mughal Empire. The author completed the work in 1695 CE, during the reign of Aurangzeb. An insertion about Aurangzeb's death was later added to the original copy by a transcriber.

Alternative transliterations of the book's title include Khulasat-Al-Tavarikh and Khulasatu-t-Tawarikh.

Authorship and date 

The author's name is not given anywhere in the actual book, but the transcribers' notes in several manuscripts mention him as Sujan Rai. Some manuscripts appended Bhandari or Batalvi to his name. The title Munshi is also prefixed to his name. One manuscript calls him the "Munshi of Munshis".

Rai was a Khatri Hindu from Batala. As a young man, he had served as a dabir (secretary) to some nobles. He knew Hindi, Persian and Sanskrit languages.

Khulasat-ut-Tawarikh was completed in the 40th year of Aurangzeb's reign, corresponding to 1695 CE. Most of the manuscripts contain a brief account of Aurangzeb's death at the end, written abruptly in a small number of lines. This section is believed to be an insertion in an early copy by a transcriber, and was repeated in the subsequent copies.

Contents

Preface 

The book has a long preface, which contains a list of 27 Persian and Sanskrit historical works used as references:

Persian translations of Sanskrit works

 Razm-Namah, translation of Mahabharata by Abdul Qadir Badayuni and Sheikh Muhammad Sultan Thanesari; commissioned by Akbar
 Translation of Ramayana; commissioned by Akbar
 Translation of Harivamsa, translated by Maulana Tabrezi; commissioned by Akbar
 Jog Basisht, translation of Yoga Vasistha by Shaikh Ahmad; commissioned by Dara Shikoh
 Kitab Bhagawat 
 Gulafshan, translation of Singhasan Battisi
 Translation of Bidhadhar's Rajavali by Nibahuram
 Translation of Pandit Raghu Nath's Rajatarangini, by Maulana Imad-ud-Din

Persian-language texts

 Tarikh-i-Mahmud Gaznawi by Maulana Unsuri; about Mahmud of Ghazni
 Tarikh-i-Sultan Shihab-ud-Din Guri; about Muhammad of Ghor
 Tarikh-i-Sultan Ala-ud-Din Khalji; about Alauddin Khalji
 Tarikh-i-Firuzshahi by Maulana A'azz-ud-Din Khalid Khani; about Firuz Shah Tughlaq
 Tarikh-i-Afaghina by Husain Khan Afghan
 Zafar Namah by Sharaf-ud-Din Ali Yazdi; about Timur
 Timur Namah by Hatifi; about Timur
 Akbar Namah by Abu'l Fazl; about Akbar
 Tarikh-i Akbar Shahi by Ata Beg Qazwini; about Akbar
 Akbar Namah by Shaykh Ilahdad Munshi Murtada Khani; about Akbar
 Tabaqat-i-Akbari by Nizam-ud-Din Ahmad Bakshi; about Akbar
 Iqbal Namah
 Jahangir Namah; about Jahangir
 Tarikh-i-Shah Jahan by Waris Khan, corrected by Sa'd Ullah Khan; about Shah Jahan
 Tarikh-i-Alamgiri by Mir Muhammad Kazim; about Aurangzeb
 Tarikh-i-Bahadur Shahi; about Bahadur Shah of Gujarat

Other

 Padmavat
 Tarikh-i-Baburi; about Babur; translated from Turki by Mirza Abad-ur-Rahim Khan Khanan
 Tarikh-i-Kashmir, translated from the Kashmiri language by Maulana Shah Muhammad Shahabadi

Geography of India during Aurangzeb's reign 

Description of Hindustan

 People and their customs
 Flora and fauna
 Geography of subahs (provinces) of the Mughal Empire
 Chief towns and rivers
 Handicrafts and other products
 Interesting localities and Buildings
 Subdivisions (sarkars and mahals), including revenues

The following provinces are covered in the book:

 Shahjahanbad (Delhi)
 Akbarabad (Agra)
 Allahabad
 Awadh
 Bihar
 Bengal
 Orissa
 Aurangabad
 Berar
 Khandesh
 Malwa
 Ajmer
 Ahmedabad (Gujarat)
 Thatta
 Multan
 Lahore
 Kashmir
 Kabul

The descriptions of many provinces, especially those away from the author's native Punjab region, are borrowed from Ain-i-Akbari. The book gives a detailed and original account of Punjab, especially the Lahore subah and the Batala sarkar.

Hindu kings of India 

This part gives an account of the pre-Islamic rulers of India, especially Delhi. It covers kings from the time of the legendary Pandava ruler Yudhishthira to Rai Pithora (Prithviraj Chauhan). The book gives a list of the rulers' names, the period of their reigns and a short account. This section is more of legends than history.

Muslim kings of India 

This part gives details of the Muslim rulers, from Nasir-ud-din Sabuktigin to Aurangzeb. A large portion of this part is borrowed from other works mentioned in the preface. The information unique to Khulasat-i-Tawarikh includes an account of the contest between Aurangzeb and his brothers.

Aurangzeb's death 

Some copies contain an insertion about Aurangzeb's death, inserted by a transcriber. This part mentions that Aurangzeb died in Ahmadnagar, Deccan. The date of his death was Friday, the 28th Zulqada of the year 1118 A. H., three hours after dawn. His age at time of his death is given as 91 years 17 days and 2 hours. The period of his reign is stated as 50 years, 2 months and 28 days.

Editio princeps 

In 1918, Archaeological Survey of India's M. Zafar Hasan made available the first editio princeps of the book. He had come across a reference to the book in Syed Ahmed Khan's Asar-us-Sanadid. He then started searching for manuscripts of the book, and consolidated them into a printed edition.

The five manuscripts used by Hasan were:

 A party worm-eaten but complete copy. It seems to be comparatively older, since it doesn't contain the description of Aurangzeb's death. It is written in Shikasta calligraphic style. Its completion is dated to the first year of the reign of Muiz-ud-din Alamgir II. Procured from Delhi.
 Written in Nastaliq calligraphic style. It is dated to year 1864 of the Vikram Samvat (1808-09). It was written in the Jaipur town, during the reign of  Jagat Singh II of Jaipur, a vassal of the Mughal Emperor Akbar II. Procured from Lucknow.
 It is written in Nastaliq characters. The year of composition is illegible. Procured from Moradabad.
 It is written in Nastaliq characters. Worm-eaten but complete. There is no date of transcription. Procured from Sardhana.
 An incomplete copy that ends with the deposition of emperor Shah Jahan. First three pages are missing. Written in Shikasta style. Procured from Delhi.

References

External links 
 Critical Editiontranslation And Annotation Of Khulasat-ut-twarikh (2006) by Shahbaz Amil; includes partial English translation
 Khulasatu-t-Tawarikh (1918), M. Zafar Hasan's edition in PDF format
 India of Aurangzib by Jadunath Sarkar; includes English translations of selected portions from Khulasat-ut-Tawarikh
 Critical edition of the Khulasat-ut-Tawarikh by Irshad Alam, in Persian

1695 books
17th-century Indian books
17th-century history books
Indian chronicles
Books about the Mughal Empire
Persian-language books